Imiliya is a small town located in the Kapilvastu District, Lumbini Province, Nepal.

External links 
 Mapcarta.com

Populated places in Kapilvastu District